María Mercedes Aizpurua Arzallus (born 18 January 1960) is a Spanish journalist and politician from the Basque Country who currently serves as Member of the Congress of Deputies of Spain.

Early life
Aizpurua was born on 18 January 1960 in Usurbil, Basque Country. She has a Bachelor of Information Science degree.

Career
Aizpurua was editor of the Egin newspaper and Punto y Hora de Euskal Herria magazine. In September 1983 Punto y Hora published an editorial on Basque separatist "soldiers" and an interview with a brother of an ETA separatist killed whilst handling an explosive device in Tafalla, Navarre. In October 1984 the Audiencia Nacional convicted Aizpurua of "supporting terrorism" and sentenced her to one year in prison and barred her from working as a journalist for one year.

Aizpurua was a journalist at the Gara newspaper since its establishment in 1999 and was a director from 1999 to 2004. In June 2001 she was interrogated by Audiencia Nacional judge Baltasar Garzón after Gara published an interview with two ETA leaders. The case against Aizpurua was finally dropped in March 2004.

Aizpurua is currently director of Gara'''s 7K Sunday newspaper. She is the author of Argala: Pensamiento en Acción : Vida y Escritos'' (2018), a biography of assassinated ETA leader Argala.

Aizpurua contested the 2011 local elections as a Bildu electoral alliance candidate in Usurbil and was elected. She was mayor of Usurbil from 2011 to 2015 and president of Udalbiltza (an association of municipalities from the greater Basque Country) from 2012 to 2015. She contested the 2019 general election as an EH Bildu electoral alliance candidate in the Province of Gipuzkoa and was elected to the Congress of Deputies.

Personal life
Aizpurua is married and has a son.

Electoral history

References

External links

1960 births
Basque journalists
Basque prisoners and detainees
Basque women in politics
EH Bildu politicians
Imprisoned journalists
Living people
Mayors of places in the Basque Country
Members of the 13th Congress of Deputies (Spain)
People from Usurbil
Prisoners and detainees of Spain
Women mayors of places in Spain
Women members of the Congress of Deputies (Spain)
Members of the 14th Congress of Deputies (Spain)